North Jiading is a station on Line 11 of the Shanghai Metro. Located on the north side of Pingcheng Road near Chengbei Road, it is the current northern terminus of the mainline service of Line 11.

This station has two sides, one of which is for passengers to board, and the other side to alight. Every side is composed of a station hall and platform at the same layer, and the two sides are not connected in the paid area. The alighting side is connected to a market nearby and Jiading North Bus Station.

Places nearby
Shanghai University, Jiading Campus
Jiading North Bus Station

References
 

Railway stations in Shanghai
Shanghai Metro stations in Jiading District
Railway stations in China opened in 2009
Line 11, Shanghai Metro